St Hilda's College is one of the constituent colleges of the University of Oxford in England. The college is named after the Anglo-Saxon Saint, Hilda of Whitby and was founded in 1893 as a hall for women; it remained a women's college until 2008. St Hilda's was the last single-sex college in the university as Somerville College had admitted men in 1994. The college now has almost equal numbers of men and women at both undergraduate and postgraduate level.

The principal of the college is Professor Sarah Springman, who took office in 2022.

As of 2018, the college had an endowment of £52.1 million and total assets of £113.4 million.

History
St Hilda's was founded by Dorothea Beale (who was also a headmistress at Cheltenham Ladies' College) in 1893, as St Hilda's Hall and recognised by the Association for the Education of Women as a women's hall in 1896. It was founded  as a women's college, a status it retained until 2008. Whilst other Oxford colleges gradually became co-educational, no serious debate at St Hilda's occurred until 1997, according to a former vice-principal, and then the debate solely applied to the issue of staff appointments. After a vote on 7 June 2006 by the Governing Body, men and women can be admitted as fellows and students. This vote was pushed through with a narrow margin and followed previous unsuccessful votes. This led to protests from students because of the "high-handed" manner in which they were held.

In October 2007 a supplemental charter was granted and in 2008 male students were admitted to St Hilda's for the first time. The college now has almost equal numbers of men and women at both undergraduate and postgraduate level. In August 2018, the interim Norrington Table showed that 98 per cent of St Hilda's finalist undergraduates obtained at least a 2.i in their degree.

Women's rowing

St Hilda's was the first 
women's college in Oxford and Cambridge to create a women's VIII in 1911. It was St Hilda's student H.G. Wanklyn who formed OUWBC and coxed in the inaugural Women's Boat Race of 1927, with five Hilda's rowers.
In 1969, the St Hilda's Eight made Oxford history when they became the first ever female crew to row in the Summer Eights. They placed 12th.

Documentary
St Hilda's students were the subject of the Channel 4 documentary series College Girls, broadcast in 2002.

Buildings and grounds
 
The college is located at the eastern end of the High Street, Oxford, over Magdalen Bridge, in Cowley Place, making it the only University of Oxford college lying east of the River Cherwell.  It is the most conveniently situated Oxford college for the Iffley Road Sports Complex, a focus for Oxford University Sport.

Buildings
Its grounds include six major buildings, which contain student accommodation, teaching areas, dining hall, the library and administration blocks. The first building occupied by the hall was Cowley House built by Humphrey Sibthorp. Together with later extensions it is now known as Hall. In 1921 the hall acquired the lease of Cherwell Hall, now known as South, which was originally Cowley Grange, a house built by A. G. Vernon Harcourt. The lease of Milham Ford, a former school between Hall and South, was acquired in 1958. More recent additions are Wolfson (opened in 1964), Garden (by Alison and Peter Smithson, opened in 1971), and the Christina Barratt Building (opened in 2001). In Autumn 2020, a new Boundary Building replaced some of the older buildings, while Milham Ford, which was demolished in 2018, was replaced by a new riverside "Pavilion". The college also owns a number of properties on Iffley Road, and in the Cowley area.

The Jacqueline Du Pré Music Building
 
The Jacqueline Du Pré Music Building (JdP) is a concert venue named after the famous cellist who was an honorary fellow of the college. The JdP was the first purpose-built concert hall to be built in Oxford since the Holywell Music Room in 1742. Built in 1995 by van Heyningen and Haward Architects, it houses the Steinway-equipped Edward Boyle Auditorium and a number of music practice rooms. In 2000 the architects designed a new, enlarged foyer space; a lean-to glass structure along the front elevation to the existing music building. In addition to frequent recitals presented by the St Hilda's Music Society, the JdP also hosts concerts by a number of world-renowned performers. Musicians who have performed in the JdP in recent years include Steven Isserlis, the Jerusalem Quartet, the Chilingirian Quartet and the Belcea Quartet. The building has also been used for amateur dramatic performances, since 2008 St Hilda's College Drama Society have been producing several plays a year in the Edward Boyle Auditorium.

Grounds
The college grounds stretch along the banks of the River Cherwell, with many college rooms overlooking the river and playing fields beyond. The college has its own fleet of punts, which students of the college may use free of charge in summer months. Unfortunately, this location at times led to problems with flooding in the former Milham Ford building.

People associated with the college

Principals

Former students

 Gaynor Arnold, novelist
 Elizabeth Aston, author
 Maudy Ayunda, Indonesian singer-songwriter and actress
 Zeinab Badawi, BBC journalist
 Kate Barker, economist
 Sarah Baxter, journalist
 Zanny Minton Beddoes, editor of The Economist
 Princess Haya Bint Al Hussein, royalty
 Susan Blackmore, parapsychologist, writer and broadcaster
 D. K. Broster, historical novelist
 Mikita Brottman, author, psychoanalyst
 Marilyn Butler, Lady Butler, academic
 Fiona Caldicott, psychiatrist, academic, chair of the Caldicott Report Committee
 Susanna Clarke, author
 Wendy Cope, poet
 Serena Cowdy, journalist
 Lettice Curtis, aviator
 Miriam Defensor Santiago, Philippine senator, Ramon Magsaysay Awardee
 Violet Mary Doudney, militant suffragette
 Daisy Dunn, author and classicist
 Barbara Everett, academic
 Susan Garden, Baroness Garden of Frognal, politician
 Helen Gardner, critic
 Margaret Gelling, toponymist
 Adele Geras, writer
 Roma Gill, academic and literary scholar
 Christina Gough, cricketer and statistician
 Karina Gould, Canadian minister
 Anna Grear, academic, Law and Theory professor, company founder and director
 Susan Greenfield, Baroness Greenfield, academic
 Susan Gritton, soprano
 Catherine Heath, novelist
 Rosalind Hill, historian
 Meg Hillier, politician
 Victoria Hislop, writer
 Bettany Hughes, historian
 Ruth Hunt, CEO of Stonewall
 Helen Jackson, politician
 Jenny Joseph, poet
 Susan Kramer, Baroness Kramer, British Liberal Democrat politician
 Angela Lambert, author and journalist
 Hermione Lee, critic and biographer
 Nicola LeFanu, composer
 Elizabeth Levett, historian
 Sue Lloyd-Roberts, Special Correspondent for the BBC (formerly at ITN)
 Margaret MacMillan, historian and Warden of St Antony's College
 Anita Mason, novelist
 Val McDermid, novelist
 Rosalind Miles, writer
 Kate Millett, feminist author
 Anne Mills FRS, health economist
 Brenda Moon, librarian
 Laura Mulvey, feminist film theorist
 Elizabeth Neville, police officer
 Katherine Parkinson, actress
 Rachel Parris, comedian
 Barbara Pym, novelist
 Pooky Quesnel, actor and screenwriter
 Betty Radice, translator and editor
 Celine Rattray, film producer
 Gillian Rose, philosopher
 Jacqueline Rose, academic and writer
 Sheila Rowbotham, feminist theorist and historian
 Gillian Shephard, Baroness Shephard of Northwold, politician
 Helen Simpson, short story writer
 Ann Thwaite, biographer
 Tsuda Umeko, educator
 Cecil Woodham-Smith, historian
Hou Yifan, chess grandmaster

Fellows

 Mary Bennett
 William Boyd, author
 Gordon Duff
 Helen Gardner
 Elspeth Kennedy
 Barbara Levick
 Beryl Smalley
 Helen Waddell
 Kathy Wilkes

Honorary fellows

 Jacqueline Du Pré
 Doris Odlum
 Rosalyn Tureck

Gallery

References

External links

 St Hilda's College (official website)
 Junior Common Room (undergraduates)
 Middle Common Room (graduates)
 St Hilda's College Ball 2015

 
Colleges of the University of Oxford
Educational institutions established in 1893
Former women's universities and colleges in the United Kingdom
Buildings and structures of the University of Oxford
1893 establishments in England